Jean Virginia (Ginny) Sampare is a Canadian woman who went missing on Thursday, October 14, 1971, outside Gitsegukla, British Columbia, Canada. She was last seen by her cousin near the railroad overpass on Highway 16 outside of Gitsegukla. Sampare's cousin, who was walking with her, went to get a jacket or a bike from his home and when he came back Sampare was gone. Despite the police and local community searching nearby areas for her for the 8 days following her disappearance, their efforts proved unsuccessful. She has not been seen since.

Despite multiple theories surrounding what could have led to her disappearance, there has been no conclusive evidence to back any of them up.

Background 
Sampare was born on September 10, 1953, into a First Nations family of Gitxsan descent. Her birth location and parents' names are not public knowledge. She is the second youngest of six children. Her siblings are Anne, Winnie, Sandra, Virginia and Rod, with Sandra being the youngest. Sampare attended high school in Hazelton, British Columbia. When she was older, she worked in a cannery and as a caretaker for her siblings. She lived with her parents in Gitsegukla. Rod described their parents as very strict and watchful; the children were not allowed to play after 9 and their parents made them work hard. Sampare was planning to move to Terrace with Rod later in the month that she went missing. She worked at the Royal Packing Company salmon canning plant in Claxton and was described as a healthy, normal 18-year-old woman.

Personality 
Growing up, Sampare was described as a shy, quiet child who sang teasing songs to her siblings. She loved to play "nurse" with her siblings and would take turns with Winnie being the nurse. Sampare would often let someone know of her plans, and it was out of character for her to leave unannounced. She volunteered as a caretaker for her siblings, protecting them when their father drank too much. Rod described her as quiet and "strong, very strong," and said that she had a promising future as a "fair-headed" girl. Rod explained in an inquiry that Sampare was careful and did not partake in any high-risk activities.

Relationship status 
Sampare's boyfriend, who also had worked at the canning plant, had gone missing shortly before she disappeared. His remains were found after Sampare disappeared. He had drowned in the Skeena River.

Identifying characteristics 
Sampare has dark hair and eyes.

Personal items at time of disappearance 
There is no public record regarding the items which Sampare had taken with her when she went missing. Though it was a cold night, she had left her jacket at home.

Disappearance 
The night of the disappearance, October 14, 1971, Rod's wife, Violet, testified that she saw Sampare at Sampare's mother's house. Violet said that Sampare's mother came home and went into the kitchen; soon after Sampare came out of the kitchen and looked like she was crying. Sampare was avoiding eye contact with Violet. Asking what was wrong, Violet said that Sampare went straight to the door, opened the door and walked out. Violet tried to call Sampare and ask where she was going. Violet tried to get Sampare, but her mother-in-law stopped her, saying that "She'll come back". Violet said that this was between 10:00 pm and 11:00 pm.

Alvin "Hyrams" (Hyzims?), Sampare's cousin, was reported to be the last person to have seen her. He was walking with Sampare alongside Highway 16 when he left to either get a jacket or a bike and then rejoin her. Alvin believed at the time that Sampare was going to a store that was close to the railroad overpass outside of town. Alvin's house was close to where he parted from Sampare, just south of the highway. Violet reported that Alvin came back to the highway and heard a vehicle door close, but Sampare was nowhere to be seen.

After Sampare did not return home that night, her mother reported her missing the next morning to the Gitsegukla Indian Band office in Gitsegukla. Someone at the band office mistakenly said that they had to wait a certain amount of time before reporting the disappearance to the Royal Canadian Mounted Police (RCMP). Even after waiting and rather than reporting it, the band office sent someone to South Hazelton and Kitimat to see if she was with her sisters Winnie or Anna, but she was not. After talking with Sampare's friends, some of them in Kispiox, they went to the RCMP.

Investigation 
On October 16, the RCMP took a missing person's report from Sampare's mother. The RCMP checked with Anna, Winnie, and Sampare's friends and other family and confirmed that no one had made contact with her since she was last seen by Alvin. The police never found any leads or further information that was ever released to the public.

The RCMP reported to Rod that the case was closed in 1985, citing a report from the Gitsegukla band Chief Councillor in 1971 that Sampare had drowned; an assertion for which there was no conclusive evidence. The case was subsequently re-opened after the family complained.

The RCMP also took DNA from Sampare's siblings around 2006. The family believed that this was in response to the Robert Pickton investigation. Nothing was reported publicly as to whether this produced any further leads in the case.

At one point Rod claimed that he saw part of the RCMP file on Sampare, which indicated that a man named Kenny Russell saw her footprints next to the river, leading to the presumption that she went in. Rod asked for a copy of the complete file but was refused.

Search effort 
For eight days after she went missing, police and community members searched for her. The village initiated the search and the RCMP joined in later with a police dog from Peace River and officers from other towns. A base of operations for the search was set up, where searchers were coordinated and fed by volunteers. The search stopped when an early snow fell. Sampare's parents started up the search again soon after the snow; the police followed suit.

The bushes and bank along the Skeena River and its tributaries in the area were searched from Kitselas Canyon, downstream of Gitsegukla, to points upstream of Gitsegukla.

The family also did some spot searches around major cities such as Vancouver and Toronto, usually after receiving a tip. Nothing worth noting publicly was found in these searches.

Gitsegukla geography 
Gitsegukla is a village located in the Skeena Valley between Hazelton and Kitwanga, British Columbia. It is in the center of the Hazelton mountain group. The area is largely mountainous with the Skeena River and some of its tributaries running through it. Topsoil is sparse, with a sandstone/shale bedrock exposed or just below the soil surface in much of the area above the Skeena, and sand, gravel and clay with exposed bedrock near and under the Skeena River. Animals in the area include salmon, trout, eagle, ravens, robins, black bears, elk, lynx, owl, coyotes, wolves and deer. There are numerous mines in the area; some were active in the 1970s, but many of them were abandoned shaft-mines. Gitsegukla is located on an Indian reserve in traditional Gitxsan territory.  The band operates out of Gitsegukla.

Awareness effort 
Both Winnie and Rod Sampare have talked to the media about their sister's disappearance and they spoke along with Victoria at an inquiry on missing and murdered Indigenous women and girls in September 2017. There were a few newspaper articles referencing her disappearance and the search effort in 1971. Other than this, there is no public record of missing posters or any other media that went out surrounding the disappearance.

Theories 
It is not publicly known what happened to Sampare. Her band at one time had tried to list her as being deceased; however, after pushback from Sampare's mother, they changed her status back to missing.

Accident, suicide or animal attack 
Rod said that a man named Kenny Russell had found some footprints near Gitsegukla River, with the implication being that Sampare fell into the river. This theory has been dispelled by Sampare's family because there was no evidence that the footprints were Sampare's or that they have ever been confirmed as footprints, considering the shoreline where they were found is mainly stone. In addition to this, Sampare's parents raised her to know not to commit suicide; instilling this attitude in both her and her siblings frequently. Although Sampare may have been under stress from the disappearance of her boyfriend and the altercation with her mother, there is no public knowledge of a suicide note or any indication that she was suicidal.

There is no publicly known evidence that Sampare was attacked by an animal.

Runaway 
There is no public record of Sampare ever running away before her disappearance. In fact, her sister Winnie stated publicly that Sampare did not partake in high-risk activities. Although she may have been under stress, it was not in her nature to break contact with her relations so abruptly and for such a prolonged period of time, and Sampare always told someone her plans. In addition to this, though it was a cold night, Sampare left her jacket at home, which indicated that she was not planning on being outside for long.

Foul play 
Neither Sampare's family nor the RCMP have ruled out foul play in her disappearance; they have not proven foul play either. There is no strong evidence that Sampare had a misadventure or committed suicide, and Sampare leaving behind her jacket on that cold night was evidence against the theory that Ginny ran away. Also, Alvin's report that he heard a vehicle door close just before he was expecting to meet up with Sampare supports the theory that she was taken by vehicle.

Friends or associates 
There is no public record that either Sampare's friends or associates had any reason to cause her disappearance.

Stranger 
There is no public record that Sampare met a stranger who caused her disappearance.

Highway of Tears 
Sampare went missing one year, almost to the day, after Helen Claire Frost, who disappeared on Tuesday, October 13, 1970, and three years before Monica Ignas, who disappeared on Friday, December 13, 1974. Frost disappeared from Prince George, British Columbia, and Ignas from Thornhill, British Columbia. The three cases are some of the first in a series of murders and disappearances upon what would later be called the Highway of Tears.

See also
List of people who disappeared

References

External links
Jean Sampare  in the Vancouver Sun, May 19, 2017

1970s missing person cases
1971 in British Columbia
20th-century First Nations people
Sampare, Jean Virginia
Highway of Tears
Missing person cases in Canada
October 1971 events in Canada
Women in British Columbia